The Stripe-headed Threadtail, (Prodasineura sita) is a species of damselfly in the family Protoneuridae. It is endemic to Sri Lanka.

References

Sources
 Query Results
 Animal diversity web
 Sri Lanka Endemics
 Photos
 List of odonates of Sri Lanka

Damselflies of Sri Lanka